Cosmatos is a surname. Notable people with the surname include:

George P. Cosmatos (1941–2005), Greco-Italian film director and screenwriter
Panos Cosmatos (born 1974), Greek-Canadian film director and screenwriter, son of George